Mat Fraser (born 1962) is an English rock musician, actor, writer and performance artist. He has thalidomide-induced phocomelia. In 2017, he was cast to play Shakespeare's Richard III at the Hull Truck Theatre as part of Hull City of Culture 2017.

Musical career 
Between 1980 and 1995 Fraser was a drummer with several rock bands including Fear of Sex, The Reasonable Strollers, Joyride, The Grateful Dub, and Living in Texas, who had a number one single in Italy. Fraser played the drums with Graeae Theatre Company's "Reasons to be Cheerful" at the 2012 Paralympics opening ceremony, where he also hosted the pre-televised section, and with Coldplay during the closing ceremony.

Acting career
Fraser left drumming to join Graeae Theatre Company, Europe's leading disabled theatre company, after their production of Ubu inspired him to change careers. He worked in forum theatre for Graeae for several months, then landed the part of Dr Prentice in Joe Orton's What the Butler Saw.  He is now a patron of Graeae.  Subsequent theatre roles in the 1990s included the Group K production of Marisol and the title role in Johnny Sol at the Croydon Warehouse.

He wrote 2005's Thalidomide!! A Musical, in which he and Anna Winslet played all the roles.

His first major television role was in the three-part World War II drama series Unknown Soldier (ITV, 1998).

In 2003 he appeared as the seer Calchas in the television miniseries Helen of Troy based on Homer's Iliad. 
In 2009 he appeared in Channel Four's Cast Offs, a six-part comedy-drama series satirising reality television .  Fraser has been associated with the use of the term "spacking up" to describe when a non-disabled actor plays the part of a disabled person rather than the part going to a disabled actor, as a play on "blacking up", used to describe the controversial practice where non-black actors take on the characters of black people. The term was actually coined by one of the show's writers, in the line "spacking up is the new blacking up".

Fraser has appeared on television in a number of other productions including Metrosexuality and Every Time You Look at Me.

His film Kung Fu Flid was released in 2009, starring Faye Tozer (formerly of pop group Steps), Frank Harper and Terry Stone.

Fraser appeared in the RTÉ One soap opera Fair City in June 2011, playing Esther's son David.

In 2012 he appeared in Kaite O'Reilly's stage play In Water I'm Weightless as part of the 2012 Cultural Olympiad.

Fraser was one of the regular cast members in the fourth season of the US TV series American Horror Story: Freak Show. He also appears as Roger in the TV series Loudermilk.

In May 2017, Fraser was cast as Shakespeare's King Richard III, ‘a disabled guy gets cast as a disabled guy’,  a role he discussed with Emma Tracey, presenter for BBC Radio's service for disabled people, "Ouch".

In 2019, Fraser played Raymond Van Geritt in the BBC One adaptation of Philip Pullman's fantasy trilogy His Dark Materials. In 2020, Fraser would write and curate the BBC Four disability series Criptales. Also in 2020, he played Jim Bell in episodes 1 and 2 of Silent Witness, Series 23 - "Deadhead ". In 2023 he played a minor role as the hospital administrator, Steve, in ITV's Maternal.

Television presenting 
Fraser was one of the original co-hosts of the BBC's Ouch! Podcast. He presented the short-lived Channel 4 series Freak Out. He presented the 2004 Channel 4 documentary Happy Birthday Thalidomide, documenting how the drug was being used in Brazil to treat leprosy, but that its use in a country with low levels of literacy and a black market in drugs was leading to new thalidomide births.

Radio 
Fraser played the lead character, Sparky, in BBC Radio Four's Saturday Playhouse production, "Inmates" (1997), by Allan Sutherland and Stuart Morris.

He was a regular performer on the BBC Radio Four sketch show "Yes Sir, I Can Boogie".

CDs 
Fraser has released two rap albums:
"Survival of the Shittest"
"Genetically Modified...Just For You" (2000)

Freak shows 
Fraser has shown a continuing interest in freak shows.

His 2001 play 'Sealboy: Freak' draws on the life history of Stanislaus Berent, a sideshow performer with naturally occurring phocomelia who worked under the stage name Sealo.

Fraser's 2002 television documentary, Born Freak, looked at this historical tradition and its relevance to modern disabled performers.  This work has become the subject of academic analysis in the field of disability studies.

As part of the documentary, Fraser performed in a Coney Island freak show.  He was invited to return to work there professionally and has since worked several summer seasons there.

Fraser's 2011 show, From Freak to Clique, charted the history of portrayals of disability, including freak show performers.

In 2014, Fraser went on to have a role as Paul the Illustrated Seal in American Horror Story: Freak Show. He played Jessica Lange's love interest in several episodes.

"Cabinet of Curiosities" 
Fraser was commissioned by the Research Centre for Museums and Galleries at the University of Leicester to create a new artistic work, shaped out of a collaborative engagement with museum collections, research and expertise in medical history, museums and disability.  The resulting  performance, "Cabinet of Curiosities: How disability was kept in a box" was performed at the Thackray Medical Museum, Leeds; the Silk Mill Museum, Derby; and Manchester Museum.  It won the Observer Ethical Awards, Arts and Culture 2014.

The Guardian'''s Lyn Gardner stated that, "by making a spectacle of himself, Fraser is not only raising the spectre of the Victorian freak show but also subverting it by questioning what is exhibited and what isn't, and making us confront what we are shown and what we are not shown, both in art and in life".

 American pantomime 

On 6 December 2017 Fraser and his wife Julie Atlas Muz presented Jack and the Beanstalk, the first large-scale pantomime to be presented in New York for over a century, at the Playhouse Theater of the Henry Street Settlement. Adapted from the fairy tale of the same title by Fraser and directed by Muz, the production also starred Dirty Martini, Matt Roper, David Ilku and a cast of other downtown performers. Awarded the NYT Critic's Pick, the production closed on 23 December 2017 and enjoyed a revival the following year at the same theatre, running for three weeks during the 2018 holiday season. On 4 December 2021 a follow-up, Dick Rivington and The Cat, adapted from the traditional pantomime story of Dick Whittington'', was presented by the pair.

Personal life 
Fraser married Julie Atlas Muz, an American neo-burlesque star, in May 2012 in New York City.

References

External links
 Official website
 

British hapkido practitioners
English male karateka
English practitioners of Brazilian jiu-jitsu
British burlesque performers
English male comedians
English drummers
British male drummers
English people with disabilities
English male taekwondo practitioners
People with phocomelia
English male television actors
English male film actors
Actors with disabilities
1962 births
Living people
Actors from Essex
Musicians from Essex
Television presenters with disabilities